Piedras Blancas is the capital town of the municipality of Castrillón, in the province of Asturias, Spain.

Piedras Blancas is a singular entity of population and has the title of Villa.

Geography

Piedras Blancas, located in the parish of Laspra, is within easy access by motorway to the main urban areas of Asturias (i.e. Oviedo, Gijón, Avilés), and many of its residents commute daily to those areas.

Although not properly in the coastline, it is within walking distance from the beaches of Salinas, Arnao and Santa Maria del Mar. The climate is oceanic, characterized by mild winters and summers, with temperatures seldom exceeding  or going below . Rain is frequent and may fall in any season, snow is rare.

External links 

Towns in Asturias